The Abilene Eagles were a West Texas League minor league baseball team based in Abilene, Texas, United States. They existed from 1920 to 1922, winning the league championship in both 1920 and 1921 under managers Bugs Young and Ed Kizziar (1920) and Grady White and Hub Northen (1921). They finished in sixth place in 1922. The league folded following the 1922 season, and the Eagles followed suit.

Future major leaguer Fred Johnson played for the Eagles.

References

Baseball teams established in 1920
Sports clubs disestablished in 1922
Defunct minor league baseball teams
Baseball teams in Abilene, Texas
Defunct baseball teams in Texas
1920 establishments in Texas
1922 disestablishments in Texas
Baseball teams disestablished in 1922